Mei-Ching Hannah Fok is a Planetary Scientist at the Goddard Space Flight Center. She was awarded the NASA Exceptional Scientific Achievement Medal in 2011 and elected a Fellow of the American Geophysical Union in 2019. She has worked on the IMAGE, Van Allen Probes and TWINS missions.

Early life and education 
Fok studied physics at the Chinese University of Hong Kong. She was awarded her Bachelor's degree in 1980, and remained there to study for a Diploma in Education. She earned her Diploma in 1984, then moved to Eastern Michigan University for her graduate studies. In 1987 Fok graduated from Eastern Michigan University with a Master's degree in physics. She joined University of Michigan, Ann Arbor for her doctorate, which she completed in 1993.

Research and career 
In 1993 Fok joined the Marshall Space Flight Center as a Research Associate. She moved to the Universities Space Research Association in 1995, where she spent six years as a staff scientist. In 2001 she became a scientist at the Goddard Space Flight Center. She studies the Van Allen radiation belts during geomagnetic storms and active times. She has studied the ring current and their role in magnetosphere – ionosphere coupling.

Fok developed the Comprehensive Inner Magnetosphere–Ionosphere model (CIMI), a bounce-averaged kinetic model that can calculate the plasma fluxes within the ring current regions of the radiation belt. Fok's CIMI model is currently being used to predict the fluxes observed by the Van Allen Probes. CIMI takes in information about magnetic fields, electric potentials, quiet-time conductances and solar wind speed, and outputs information about ion fluxes, plasmasphere density and ionospheric potentials. Using the model Fok found that the main phase pressure of the magnetosphere was not created by the solar wind, but instead dominated by energetic protons from the plasmasphere. Fok was awarded the NASA Exceptional Scientific Achievement Medal for the development of CIMI. Her citation read "For creation of state-of-the-art numerical models that account for the complex couplings between the solar wind, radiation belts, ring current, ionosphere and magnetosphere". 

Alongside creating the CIMI model, Fok works on Neutral Atom Imaging, and her modelling tools were used in both the IMAGE and TWINS missions.

Awards and honours 
Her awards and honours include;

 2011 NASA Exceptional Scientific Achievement Medal
 2019 Elected Fellow of the American Geophysical Union

Selected publications 
Her publications include;

References 

Living people
Chinese University of Hong Kong people
Eastern Michigan University alumni
Michigan State University alumni
University of Michigan alumni
Fellows of the American Geophysical Union
Year of birth missing (living people)
Goddard Space Flight Center people
20th-century women scientists
21st-century women scientists